This is a reverse-chronological list of oil spills that have occurred throughout the world and spill(s) that are currently ongoing. Quantities are measured in tonnes of crude oil with one tonne roughly equal to 308 US gallons, 256 Imperial gallons, 7.33 barrels, or 1165 litres. This calculation uses a median value of 0.858 for the specific gravity of light crude oil; actual values can range from 0.816 to 0.893, so the amounts shown below are inexact.  They are also estimates, because the actual volume of an oil spill is difficult to measure exactly.

Confirmed spills

Investigation underway

Note:  The "flow rate" column applies to leaking wells, pipelines, etc., and is often used to estimate the total amount of oil spilled.  The "full cargo" column applies to vessels, vehicles, etc., and represents the maximum amount of oil that could be spilled.  The "spilled" columns indicate the total amount of oil that has been released to the environment so far, and should be based on official estimates found in referenced sources whenever possible.  When official estimates vary, use the "min tonnes" and "max tonnes" columns to show the range of estimates (minimum and maximum) in metric tonnes (i.e. 1 tonne = 1,000 kg).

Oil spills in the United States 
This graphic is limited to oil spills that occurred between 1969 and 2015 (graphic has not been updated for newer spills) and that affected US waters (land-based spills are not depicted).  Unlike the units of tonnes used on the rest of this page, the graphic's numbers are presented in millions of US gallons (abbreviated as "MG" in the graphic), where 1 MG is roughly equal to 3,250 tonnes of crude oil.

See also
 Lists
 Largest oil spills
 Natural gas and oil production accidents in the United States
 Pipeline accidents
 United States offshore drilling debate

Notes

References

External links

Tanker Incidents at Maritime Connector
WorldSpills.com  View World Oil spill on a map, Images, descriptions, and references of more than 300 major oil spills
 11 Major Oil Spills Of The Maritime World
 NOAA oil spills incidents map

Oil spills

Oil spills
Oil spills